Anna Luisa Daigneault (born December 1, 1982), known by her stage name Quilla, is a Canadian songwriter, vocalist, keyboardist, producer, DJ, and linguistic anthropologist. She was born and raised in Montreal, Quebec. Her father is from Quebec and her mother is Peruvian, of Spanish and indigenous Quechua and Aymara descent. Her stage name "Quilla" is inspired by the Quechua word for "moon".

Daigneault is known for her contributions as a dance music vocalist in the genres of progressive house, deep house, techno, trance, breaks, and others. Her vocals have been featured on tracks by producers such as Tiësto, Sultan + Ned Shepard, Feenixpawl, Heatbeat on labels such as Universal Music, Revealed Recordings, Armada Music, Visionquest, and others. Her work as a live electronic performer is unique because she sings live while mixing tracks, and uses keyboards, vocal effects and a looping pedal. In 2016, she shifted away from being a featured vocalist and became an electronic producer, releasing her own self-produced electronic pop album You Got It in April 2017.

Daigneault has composed and produced electronic music for film soundtracks, stop motion animations, and documentaries. Outside of her work in music and film, she has also published over thirty online talking dictionaries through her work with Living Tongues Institute for Endangered Languages as well as articles in the field of endangered language conservation. She currently resides in Greensboro, North Carolina.

Early life 
Daigneault grew up in Montreal's Notre-Dame-de-Grâce neighborhood and attended St. Ignatius of Loyola School. She later went to Villa Sainte-Marcelline in Westmount for grades 5 through 11. A member of the Questo Rhythmic Gymnastic Club, Daigneault was a rhythmic gymnast from the age of 5 to 17. She competed in the Canada Games in the mid-90s, and was part of the Canadian Junior National team in 1997. During her youth, she learned hard work and discipline, and she also became intensely interested in music, always looking for the next great track to use for a gymnastics routine.

Daigneault studied classical piano with teacher Joan Pierrepoint until she was 16, and started composing for piano around 11 years old. She began writing songs and poetry at an early age, but was too shy to sing in front of anyone until her late teens.

Towards the end of high school, she had a brief stint as a bassist in a local Montreal punk band with several friends. During her college years at Dawson College and McGill University, she gained valuable experience playing keyboards in several indie rock bands, as well as a 7-piece social justice Afrobeat funk band named Music Mind Movement. Throughout her formative years, she was heavily influenced by Montreal’s free jazz and experimental electronic music community, and played in many venues in her home city.

Research and influences 

As a student at McGill University, Daigneault studied anthropology and linguistics, and became interested in vocal traditions from around the world, archaeology and the study of hieroglyphics. She worked as a student archaeologist at Minanha, a Pre-Columbian Mayan site in Belize, and also worked on an excavation with a team from the University of Sydney at Angkor Wat's ancient water systems in Cambodia.

Between 2007 and 2010, as a graduate student at Université de Montréal, Daigneault focused her attention on the endangered languages and vocal traditions of South America. She embarked on various field trips to Peru, Chile and Paraguay, and traveled to the Peruvian Amazon on three occasions to live among the Yanesha people. She was a field assistant for National Geographic’s Enduring Voices Project expeditions and worked with indigenous collaborators on several language revitalization projects. She has worked part-time for Living Tongues Institute for Endangered Languages since 2011. Her research background has strongly influenced the cultural content and otherworldly themes explored in her music.

Bands & Live Acts 

In 2006, with drummer / producer Sam Vipond, Daigneault formed Pamplemousse Explosion, a cabaret-noise-jazz duo that rocked Montreal’s indie circuit between 2006 and 2009. The duo was invited to record a track with legendary recording engineer and inventor, George Massenburg at McGill University's School of Music. Daigneault later formed experimental electronic projects such as Feast of Spirits with long-time collaborator and friend Oliver Lewis. When she lived in Lima briefly in 2008 and 2010, she formed electronic indie pop duo Mono y Banana with Leonardo Camacho. She also was the frontwoman of Banana Lazuli, a psych rock project with a rotating cast of members. As Banana Lazuli, she performed at many local shows and festivals in the Bay Area, where she lived in 2011, and in North Carolina between 2012 and 2014. She toured the US and Canada, opening for Crystal Bright and the Silver Hands. Toward mid-2014, she ceased using all other monikers and only performed as Quilla. She began performing as a DJ / live vocalist in 2014.

Dance Music Collaborations 

Between 2007 and 2010, Daigneault worked at Public Outreach, a company that fundraises for humanitarian organizations such as Doctors Without Borders and Unicef Canada. At Public Outreach, she met Ned Shepard, one half of Sultan + Ned Shepard, rising stars in the world of progressive house music (also known as EDM). After seeing Daigneault’s band Pamplemousse Explosion perform in 2009, Shepard invited her to write lyrics and collaborate in his recording studio with his production partner Sultan. They co-wrote a song called “Walls” which was later included in Tiësto’s acclaimed compilation, Club Life: Volume Two Miami. It was released by Musical Freedom in 2012 and the album peaked at 16 on Billboard 200. For the release of "Walls", Daigneault conceived of the moniker Quilla, to differentiate the track from the other projects she was a part of. The song "Walls" became an international dancefloor hit, was a staple in Tiësto’s festival and club sets, and was a radio hit in Canada.

Following the success of "Walls", Daigneault decided to broaden her musical horizons and expand her vocal range and style, studying North Indian Classical music with Sargam Shah in California, as well as opera with singer Elena DeAngelis in North Carolina in 2013. Daigneault found herself in high demand to record vocals, and she completed and released over a dozen collaborations and vocal features between 2012 and 2014. She wrote and performed the lyrics for Feenixpawl’s “Universe” (Neon Records), Jewelz & Scott Sparks’ smash hit “Unless We Forget” (Revealed Recordings), and she has written lyrics for many other international producers such as Heatbeat and Pascal & Pearce. She is a featured vocalist on Tiësto's 2014 album A Town Called Paradise, on a track called "Close To Me" in collaboration with Tiësto, Sultan + Ned Shepard. She is featured on "To The Core" on Julian Calor's 2015 hit album Evolve released by Revealed Recordings. She released several more dance music collaborations in 2016 and 2017.

Lyrics and Style 

As a dance music vocalist, Daigneault is known for her unique lyrics and dreamy vocal style, which is soaring yet intimate and ethereal. Her lyrical content is influenced by her experiences traveling and researching different cultures around the globe. She views the dance music world as a catalyst for producing transformative experiences in people. She explores positive themes in her lyrics, such as healing, dealing with regret and loss, breaking through obstacles and learning to love oneself. In an interview with Neon Vision, Daigneault observed, "When I see my friends and family going through experiences in life, I try to take those emotions and channel them into meaningful lyrics for people so when they are on the dance floor, they have an emotional catharsis – that’s my goal."

Solo Work 
Daigneault performed a vocal looping show at the Center Camp stage at Burning Man in 2010 was approached afterward by renowned DJ Seth Troxler who shortly thereafter signed her to his label Visionquest. The label delayed in releasing her first album for nearly three years because the content of the album spanned indie rock, folktronica and piano pop, and was thus different from the rest of the label's techno esthetic. In early 2014, Visionquest instead released a three-part special edition vinyl series containing tech house remixes of Quilla's album tracks. The remixers included Ricardo Villalobos, Matthew Herbert and Craig Richards (DJ).

Daigneault's first album as Quilla Beautiful Hybrid was released on her own label, Ritual Fire Records, in June 2014. It was met with critical acclaim. Writer Jackie Roy observed, "There is a lot of anticipation to see what Quilla comes up with next, as a pleasant surprise is always expected with her knack for collaborating so many different styles and genres." Editors at Flush Magazine wrote, "Quilla is a multi-talented, multifaceted, hyper literate singer-songstress offering a fresh perspective, fascinating imagery, and songs befitting of the album title.”

Daigneault's second albumYou Got It was released in April 2017 and also garnered positive reviews from dance music blogs We Rave You, as well as I Want EDM. "Kicking off with eerie drum-work, the listener is met with her spellbinding and ethereal voice – one that soothes the senses like silk would. Exciting more emotions in the listener, Quilla carries off the track well with her pitch perfect adeptness behind both, the microphone as well as the production desk." "This last year [Quilla] has been hard at work producing her new album ‘You Got It’, and it does not disappoint. The slick, varied productions alongside beautiful, poetic vocal forms a hybrid genre which Quilla has created. The influences of the producers she has worked with and her dance music background are evident, but her ability to transcend genres and tie all the brilliant intricacies of her production together is majestic."

References

External links
Quilla (Official Website)

1982 births
Living people
Musicians from Montreal
Canadian people of Peruvian descent
21st-century Canadian women singers
Canadian dance musicians
Canadian electronic musicians
Canadian keyboardists
Canadian women in electronic music
Musicians from Greensboro, North Carolina